Ramakrishna Mission Ashrama is the Kanpur branch of the Ramakrishna Mission. The Ashram runs a charitable hospital, a senior secondary boy's high school and a library beside other charitable works.

History
The founder of Kanpur "Ramakrishna Seva Sadan" (of late known as Ram Krishna mission Ashram) was "Nepal Maharaj". Popularly known as "Nepalda" alias "Master Moshai", he was a revolutionary too. His family name was "Shri. Nepaleshwar Banerjee". He settled in Kanpur along with his two younger brothers, "Gangadhar Banerjee" a renounced architect and civil engineer, very popularly known as Gangada, and the youngest brother, Shri Khagendra Nath Banerjee (a technocrat) popularly known as Khagen Babu ,at a stone throw distance to the R.K. Mission ashram at R.K. Nagar Kanpur, Gangadhar Babu constructed their residential house at 110/204, G.T. Road, R.K. Nagar.
Nepal Maharaja was the only founder of Kanpur Ram Krishna Seva Sadan, and he was the founder Secretary of Kanpur Ram Krishna mission and no one else as claimed by some other people.

The Ashrama at Kanpur started modestly at Raja Manzil, Birana Road, in the 1920s. The Ashrama was called ‘Ramakrishna Seva Sadan’ and Srimat Swami Vijnanananda, a direct disciple of Sri Ramakrishna, first visited this group. With the increase in activities, Ramakrishna Seva Sadan was moved to a new address at Aga Kothi, Ram Narayan Bazar, and was affiliated with the Headquarters at Belur Math in 1931. The Ashrama was now officially ‘Ramakrishna Mission Ashrama’.

Location
The Ashrama was transferred then to a new place in Raja Manjil of Ram Narayan Bazar. In 1931, it got affiliation to Belur Math. Owing to financial constraints, the Ashrama was shifted first to Anwarganj, and, then to the present site on 13 August 1937 in Gumti No. 5 on the piece of land measuring 1.5 acres, donated by Kanpur Improvement Trust. The locality in which Ashrama is situated, was later on named ‘Ramakrishna Nagar’.

Activities
 Govt. Aided Senior Secondary High School for boys - The Ashrama used to run a School named ‘Vivekananda Vidyapith’ in a small dilapidated building. In 1947, construction started on a new building just across the main campus, and this became the Ramakrishna Mission School. In 1983-4, because of its continuous outstanding performance in academics, the School was designated ‘Best School’ by the Uttar Pradesh State Government. At present the Senior Secondary High School is affiliated to the U.P. Board having 800 students. The medium of instruction is Hindi. The Ashrama also conducts Free Coaching for poor students in the evening.
Charitable Medical Dispensary - Responding to the health needs of the poor, the Ashrama started a charitable dispensary in a small ramshackle room. It later became known as ‘Baba Ka Hospital, Hospital of the sadhus’. Today, the Ashrama has Allopathic as well as Homeopathic sections. General practitioners and specialists in Orthopedic surgery, Ophthalmology, Otorhinolaryngology, Gynecology, Dental surgery, Pediatrics, and Psychiatry regularly offer free services. A well-equipped Physiotherapy Unit, Pathology laboratory, and X-Ray unit are attached to the dispensary. ECG investigations are carried out by Technicians and Doctors. Moreover, a Mobile Medical Unit goes to rural areas and conducts camps in General Health and Eye check-up.
Public library - The library was inaugurated in 1967 by Sri C. B. Gupta, then Chief Minister of Uttar Pradesh. A Reading Room is also attached to the Library. There are 10 newspapers, 100 periodicals, and 31,400 books on different subjects. Out of this 13,500 course books on competitive examinations in the Textbook section attracts a large number of students from schools, colleges, and universities. The Library is well-maintained and is one of the best in the city.
Philanthropic Activities -  The Ashrama conducts daily a free coaching centre for poor boys and girls. It also runs a Children Development Centre which, apart from teaching children, gives them refreshments, clothes, and study materials. It also conducts relief activities like free distribution of blankets, clothes, books, and so on. A Counseling Centre and Spoken English classes attract a lot of youth.
Vivekananda Samiti at IIT, Kanpur - Started in 1968 by the inspiration of Ramakrishna Mission, Kanpur, the Vivekananda Samiti at IIT Kanpur is functioning for more than four decades. It is involved in spreading the message of Swami Vivekananda among students.

References

External links
 rkmkanpur.org, Ramakrishna Mission Ashrama, Kanpur, Official website

Ramakrishna Mission
Boys' schools in India
Schools affiliated with the Ramakrishna Mission
Health charities in India
Educational institutions established in 1931
1931 establishments in India
Dispensaries in India